The Off West End Theatre Awards, nicknamed The Offies, were launched in 2010 to recognise and celebrate excellence, innovation and ingenuity of independent Off West End theatres across London. Over 80 theatres participate in the awards, with more than 400 productions being considered annually by a team of 40 assessors, with the winners chosen by a select panel of critics.

History
The Off West End Theatre Awards were launched in 2010  to commemorate and recognise on and off-stage talent within the theatre industry of around 80 of London's independent Off West End theatres.
The first-ever award ceremony for The Offies was held on 27 February 2011 with Simon Callow hosting the event. The aim of the awards is to help raise the profile and status of independent theatres in London by rewarding productions not eligible for the Society of London Theatre-Laurence Olivier Awards. The winners are selected by a panel of theatre critics.

In 2014, Phoebe Waller-Bridge won two Off West End Theatre awards for her one-woman show Fleabag at the Soho Theatre.

Ceremony

Award categories
Plays

 Performance Piece (Non-binary)
 Female Performance in a Supporting Role in a Play
 Female Performance In a Play
 Male Performance in a Supporting Role in a Play
 Male Performance In a Play
 Most Promising New Playwright
 New Play
 Director
 Production
Musicals & Opera

 Female Performance in a Supporting Role in a Musical
 Female Performance in a Musical
 Male Performance in a Supporting Role in a Musical
 Male Performance in a Musical
 Musical Director
 Director
 New Musical
 Musical Production
 Opera Production
Design
 Costume Design
 Sound Design
 Set Design
 Lighting Design
 Video Design

Productions for Young People

 Ages 0–7
 Ages 8+
 Ages 13+

Special

 Artistic Director
 Producer
 Special Achievement

Other

 IDEA (Innovative / Devised / Experimental / Atypical)
 Choreography/Movement
 Performance Ensemble
 Company Ensemble
 TBC (shows that don't fit other categories)

Recent finalists and winners

Recent winners and nominations have included:

Performance Piece
2019 Arinzé Kene in Misty at the Bush Theatre (winner) 
2019 Bryony Kimmings in I'm a Phoenix, Bitch at the Battersea Arts Centre (Nom) 

Best Female Performance in a Play 
2015 Linda Bassett in Visitors at the Bush Theatre and Arcola Theatre (winner) 
2015 Shannon Tarbet in The Edge Of Our Bodies at the Gate Theatre (Nom) 
2017 Louise Jameson in The Diva Drag at The Hope (Nom) 
2017 Rona Morison in The Diary of a Teenage Girl at the Southwark Playhouse (Nom) 
2017 Jenna Russell in Grey Gardens at the Southwark Playhouse (Nom) 
2018 Mimi Ndiweni  in The Convert at the Gate Theatre (winner) 
2018 Lucy Robinson in Late Company at the Finborough Theatre (Nom) 
2019 Sarah Niles in Leave Taking at the Bush Theatre (winner) 
2019 Louise Jameson in Vincent River at the Park Theatre (Nom) 
2019 Monica Dolan in The B*easts at the Bush Theatre (Nom) 
2019 Sinéad Cusack in Stitchers at the Jermyn Street Theatre (Nom) 

Male Performance in a Play
2017 John Ramm in Sheppey at the Orange Tree Theatre (winner) 
2017 Phil Dunster in Pink Mist at the Bush Theatre (Nom) 
2017 Paul Keating in Kenny Morgan at the Arcola Theatre (Nom) 
2018 Ben Aldridge in Run The Beast Down at the Finborough Theatre (winner) 
2018 Ken Nwosu in An Octoroon at the Orange Tree Theatre (winner) 
2018 Ian McDiarmid in What Shadows at the Park Theatre (Nom) 
2019 Harry McEntire in Homos, or Everyone in America at the Finborough Theatre (Nom) 

Best Performance in a Play 
2022 Rachel Tucker in John & Jen at the Southwark Playhouse (Nom) 
2022 Rosemary Ashe in Call Me Madam at the Upstairs at The Gatehouse (Nom) 

Female Performance in a Supporting Role in a Play  
2018 Jo Martin in Doubt: A Parable at the Southwark Playhouse (winner) 
2018 Sinead Matthews in Loot at the Park Theatre (Nom) 
2018 Vivian Oparah in An Octoroon at the Orange Tree Theatre (Nom) 

Male Performance in a Supporting Role in a Play  
2018 Tom Rhys Harries in The Pitchfork Disney at the Shoreditch Town Hall (winner) 
2018 Danny Hatchard in Eyes Closed, Ears Covered at The Bunker (theatre) (Nom) 
2019 Wil Johnson in Leave Taking at the Bush Theatre (winner)
2019 Malcolm Sinclair in Pressure at the Park Theatre (Nom)
2019 Nitin Ganatra in End of the Pier at the Park Theatre (Nom)

Female Performance in a Musical  
2019 Caroline O’Connor in The Rink at the Southwark Playhouse (winner)

Male Performance in a Musical  
2020 Keith Ramsay in Preludes at the Southwark Playhouse (winner)
2020 Richard Shelton in Sinatra: Raw at Crazy Coqs / Brasserie Zedel (Nom)

See also
Olivier Awards
Evening Standard Theatre Awards
Critcs' Circle Theatre Award
UK Theatre Awards
Ian Charleson Awards
Sam Wanamaker Award
WhatsOnStageAwards

References

External links
 Official website
 Organiser's website

Award ceremonies
British awards
Ceremonies in the United Kingdom
Stagecraft
London awards
Awards established in 2010
British theatre awards
2010 establishments in the United Kingdom
Theatre in London